Journey to the North is a 1602 Chinese shenmo novel by Yu Xiangdou (died 1637). The book is considered to be one of the Four Journeys. The protagonist is the god Zhenwu.

English translation

References

17th-century Chinese novels
Ming dynasty novels
Shenmo novels